"L'enfer" (English: "Hell") is a song by Belgian singer-songwriter Stromae. It was first released on 9 January 2022 with a live performance during an interview on the evening news on main French television channel TF1. It deals with depression and suicidal thoughts. It is the second single from his album Multitude, which was released on 4 March 2022.

Track listing

Charts

Weekly charts

Year-end charts

Certifications

Release history

References

2022 singles
2022 songs
SNEP Top Singles number-one singles
Songs written by Stromae
Stromae songs
Ultratop 50 Singles (Flanders) number-one singles
Ultratop 50 Singles (Wallonia) number-one singles